Eschweilera squamata is a species of woody plant in the family Lecythidaceae. It is found only in French Guiana.

References

squamata
Endemic flora of French Guiana
Vulnerable plants
Taxonomy articles created by Polbot